Events from the year 1840 in Denmark.

Incumbents
 Monarch – Christian VIII
 Prime minister – Otto Joachim

Events

 1 January – An act establishes Copenhagen's municipal constitution. The 38 members of the City Council are to be elected by the citizens whereas the three mayors and the lord mayor are to be appointed by the king as was previously the case.
 9 April – The first election for the new City Council is held. Only 1929 citizens, out of a population of about 121,000, are able to participate in the election due to heavy restrictions on voting access.
 27 June – The anointing of King Christian VIII at Frederiksberg Palace, the last such ceremony to take place in Denmark before it is abolished with the introduction of the Danish constitution in 1849.
 8 September – Søren Kierkegaard reveals his feelings for her to Regine Olsen

Undated

 Peter Faber takes the first Danish photograph on record at Ulfeldts Plads in Copenhagen.
 Historisk Tidsskrift, a Danish history journal, is established with Christian Molbech as its first editor.

Births

 4 January – Matilde Bajer, women's rights activist and pacifist (died 1934)
 10 June – Theodor Philipsen, painter (died 1920)
 5 September – Troels Frederik Lund, historian (died 1921)
 3 November – Christian Fenger. Danish-American surgeon (died 1902)
 17 December – C. F. E. Horneman, composer (died 1906)
 28 December – Henning Matzen, politician (died 1910)

Deaths
 23 November – Christian Waagepetersen, wine merchant and philanthropist (born 1787)

References

 
1840s in Denmark
Denmark
Years of the 19th century in Denmark